Pyrausta limbata is a moth in the family Crambidae. It was described by Arthur Gardiner Butler in 1879. It is found in Japan.

References

Moths described in 1879
limbata
Moths of Japan